Pristaulacus strangaliae is a species of wasp in the family Aulacidae and the order Hymenoptera found in North America. They are diurnal.

References

Further reading

 

Parasitic wasps
Articles created by Qbugbot
Insects described in 1917
Evanioidea
Taxa named by Sievert Allen Rohwer